Boniface (1245–1263) was Count of Savoy from 1253 to 1263, succeeding his father Amadeus IV. He never married and thus left no heir.

Career
Boniface was born in Chambéry.  Since he became Count of Savoy at the age of nine, he required a regency. Throughout the decade before his death, Savoy was governed through a joint regency resembling that devised for his grandfather Thomas in 1189, in which authority was shared between his mother, Cecile of Baux, and one of his uncles, Thomas II of Piedmont.  Boniface's other uncles, Peter and Philip, disputed this, seeking to divide the county's many properties, but Thomas took it to arbitration per the family treaty of 1234 which had been negotiated by his brother William and won out. Peter and Philip were, however, granted compensation in return, receiving more properties within the county.  When Thomas died in 1259, Cecile continued as regent in Savoy.  Under her regency, Philip and Peter continued their previous work of expanding the control and influence over the County of Savoy.

Boniface's campaigns in Flanders and Piedmont were not successful.  In September 1262, Rudolf of Geneva offered homage to cousin Boniface after yet another round of the war between Peter and their kin in Geneva.  In 1263, Boniface was mortally wounded in battle and died, to be succeeded by his uncle Peter.

Notes

References
 
 
 

1245 births
1263 deaths
13th-century Counts of Savoy
People from Chambéry
Military personnel killed in action